Constantinople (see other names) became the de facto capital of the Roman Empire upon its founding in 330, and became the de jure capital in AD 476 after the fall of Ravenna and the Western Roman Empire. It remained the capital of the Eastern Roman Empire (also known as the Byzantine Empire; 330–1204 and 1261–1453), the Latin Empire (1204–1261), and the Ottoman Empire (1453–1922). Following the Turkish War of Independence, the Turkish capital then moved to Ankara. Officially renamed Istanbul in 1930, the city is today the largest city and financial centre of the Republic of Turkey (1923–present). It is also the largest city in Europe.

In 324, after the Western and Eastern Roman Empires were reunited, the ancient city of Byzantium was selected to serve as the new capital of the Roman Empire, and the city was renamed Nova Roma, or "New Rome", by Emperor Constantine the Great. On 11 May 330, it was renamed to Constantinople, and dedicated to Constantine. Constantinople is generally considered to be the center and the "cradle of Orthodox Christian civilization". From the mid-5th century to the early 13th century, Constantinople was the largest and wealthiest city in Europe. The city became famous for its architectural masterpieces, such as Hagia Sophia, the cathedral of the Eastern Orthodox Church, which served as the seat of the Ecumenical Patriarchate, the sacred Imperial Palace where the emperors lived, the Hippodrome, the Golden Gate of the Land Walls, and opulent aristocratic palaces. The University of Constantinople was founded in the fifth century and contained artistic and literary treasures before it was sacked in 1204 and 1453, including its vast Imperial Library which contained the remnants of the Library of Alexandria and had 100,000 volumes. The city was the home of the Ecumenical Patriarch of Constantinople and guardian of Christendom's holiest relics such as the Crown of thorns and the True Cross.

Constantinople was famous for its massive and complex fortifications, which ranked among the most sophisticated defensive architecture of antiquity. Constantinople's location between the Golden Horn and the Sea of Marmara reduced the land area that needed defensive walls. The city was built intentionally to rival Rome, and it was claimed that several elevations within its walls matched Rome's 'seven hills'. The impenetrable defenses enclosed magnificent palaces, domes, and towers, the result of prosperity Constantinople achieved as the gateway between two continents (Europe and Asia) and two seas (the Mediterranean and the Black Sea). Although besieged on numerous occasions by various armies, the defenses of Constantinople proved impenetrable for nearly nine hundred years.

In 1204, however, the armies of the Fourth Crusade took and devastated the city and, for several decades, its inhabitants resided under Latin occupation in a dwindling and depopulated city. In 1261 the Byzantine Emperor Michael VIII Palaiologos liberated the city, and after the restoration under the Palaiologos dynasty, it enjoyed a partial recovery. With the advent of the Ottoman Empire in 1299, the Byzantine Empire began to lose territories and the city began to lose population. By the early 15th century, the Byzantine Empire was reduced to just Constantinople and its environs, along with Morea in Greece, making it an enclave inside the Ottoman Empire. The city was finally besieged and conquered by the Ottoman Empire in 1453, remaining under its control until the early 20th century, after which it was renamed Istanbul under the Empire's successor state, Turkey.

Names

Before Constantinople 
According to Pliny the Elder in his Natural History, the first known name of a settlement on the site of Constantinople was Lygos, a settlement likely of Thracian origin founded between the 13th and 11th centuries BC. The site, according to the founding myth of the city, was abandoned by the time Greek settlers from the city-state of Megara founded Byzantium (Byzántion) in around 657 BC, across from the town of Chalcedon on the Asiatic side of the Bosphorus.

The origins of the name of Byzantion, more commonly known by the later Latin Byzantium, are not entirely clear, though some suggest it is of Thracian origin. The founding myth of the city has it told that the settlement was named after the leader of the Megarian colonists, Byzas. The later Byzantines of Constantinople themselves would maintain that the city was named in honor of two men, Byzas and Antes, though this was more likely just a play on the word Byzantion.

The city was briefly renamed Augusta Antonina in the early 3rd century AD by the Emperor Septimius Severus (193–211), who razed the city to the ground in 196 for supporting a rival contender in the civil war and had it rebuilt in honor of his son Marcus Aurelius Antoninus (who succeeded him as Emperor), popularly known as Caracalla. The name appears to have been quickly forgotten and abandoned, and the city reverted to Byzantium/Byzantion after either the assassination of Caracalla in 217 or, at the latest, the fall of the Severan dynasty in 235.

Names of Constantinople 

Byzantium took on the name of Kōnstantinoupolis ("city of Constantine", Constantinople) after its refoundation under Roman emperor Constantine I, who transferred the capital of the Roman Empire to Byzantium in 330 and designated his new capital officially as Nova Roma 'New Rome'. During this time, the city was also called 'Second Rome', 'Eastern Rome', and Roma Constantinopolitana (Latin for "Constantinople Rome"). As the city became the sole remaining capital of the Roman Empire after the fall of the West, and its wealth, population, and influence grew, the city also came to have a multitude of nicknames.

As the largest and wealthiest city in Europe during the 4th–13th centuries and a center of culture and education of the Mediterranean basin, Constantinople came to be known by prestigious titles such as Basileuousa (Queen of Cities) and Megalopolis (the Great City) and was, in colloquial speech, commonly referred to as just Polis 'the City' by Constantinopolitans and provincial Byzantines alike.

In the language of other peoples, Constantinople was referred to just as reverently. The medieval Vikings, who had contacts with the empire through their expansion in eastern Europe (Varangians) used the Old Norse name Miklagarðr (from mikill 'big' and garðr 'city'), and later Miklagard and Miklagarth. In Arabic, the city was sometimes called Rūmiyyat al-Kubra (Great City of the Romans) and in Persian as Takht-e Rum (Throne of the Romans).

In East and South Slavic languages, including in Kievan Rus', Constantinople has been referred to as Tsargrad (Царьград) or Carigrad, 'City of the Caesar (Emperor)', from the Slavonic words tsar ('Caesar' or 'King') and grad ('city').

In Persian the city was also called Asitane meaning ‘The Threshold of the State’, and in Armenian language it was Gosdantnubolis ‘City of Constantine’.

Modern names of the city 

The modern Turkish name for the city, İstanbul, derives from the Greek phrase eis tin Polin, meaning "(in)to the city". This name was used in Turkish alongside Kostantiniyye, the more formal adaptation of the original Constantinople, during the period of Ottoman rule, while western languages mostly continued to refer to the city as Constantinople until the early 20th century. In 1928, the Turkish alphabet was changed from Arabic script to Latin script. After that, as part of the 1920s Turkification movement, Turkey started to urge other countries to use Turkish names for Turkish cities, instead of other transliterations to Latin script that had been used in Ottoman times. In time the city came to be known as Istanbul and its variations in most world languages.

The name "Constantinople" is still used by members of the Eastern Orthodox Church in the title of one of their most important leaders, the Orthodox patriarch based in the city, referred to as "His Most Divine All-Holiness the Archbishop of Constantinople New Rome and Ecumenical Patriarch." In Greece today, the city is still called Konstantinoúpoli(s) or simply just "the City".

History

Foundation of Byzantium 

Constantinople was founded by the Roman emperor Constantine I (272–337) in 324 on the site of an already-existing city, Byzantium, which was settled in the early days of Greek colonial expansion, in around 657 BC, by colonists of the city-state of Megara. This is the first major settlement that would develop on the site of later Constantinople, but the first known settlements was that of Lygos, referred to in Pliny's Natural Histories. Apart from this, little is known about this initial settlement. The site, according to the founding myth of the city, was abandoned by the time Greek settlers from the city-state of Megara founded Byzantium in around 657  BC, across from the town of Chalcedon on the Asiatic side of the Bosphorus.

Hesychius of Miletus wrote that some "claim that people from Megara, who derived their descent from Nisos, sailed to this place under their leader Byzas, and invent the fable that his name was attached to the city." Some versions of the founding myth say Byzas was the son of a local nymph, while others say he was conceived by one of Zeus' daughters and Poseidon. Hesychius also gives alternate versions of the city's founding legend, which he attributed to old poets and writers:
It is said that the first Argives, after having received this prophecy from Pythia,
    Blessed are those who will inhabit that holy city,
    a narrow strip of the Thracian shore at the mouth of the Pontos,
    where two pups drink of the gray sea,
    where fish and stag graze on the same pasture,
set up their dwellings at the place where the rivers Kydaros and Barbyses have their estuaries, one flowing from the north, the other from the west, and merging with the sea at the altar of the nymph called Semestre"

The city maintained independence as a city-state until it was annexed by Darius I in 512 BC into the Persian Empire, who saw the site as the optimal location to construct a pontoon bridge crossing into Europe as Byzantium was situated at the narrowest point in the Bosphorus strait. Persian rule lasted until 478 BC when as part of the Greek counterattack to the Second Persian invasion of Greece, a Greek army led by the Spartan general Pausanias captured the city which remained an independent, yet subordinate, city under the Athenians, and later to the Spartans after 411 BC. This treaty would pay dividends retrospectively as Byzantium would maintain this independent status, and prosper under peace and stability in the Pax Romana, for nearly three centuries until the late 2nd century AD.

Byzantium was never a major influential city-state like that of Athens, Corinth or Sparta, but the city enjoyed relative peace and steady growth as a prosperous trading city lent by its remarkable position. The site lay astride the land route from Europe to Asia and the seaway from the Black Sea to the Mediterranean, and had in the Golden Horn an excellent and spacious harbor. Already then, in Greek and early Roman times, Byzantium was famous for the strategic geographic position that made it difficult to besiege and capture, and its position at the crossroads of the Asiatic-European trade route over land and as the gateway between the Mediterranean and Black Seas made it too valuable a settlement to abandon, as Emperor Septimius Severus later realized when he razed the city to the ground for supporting Pescennius Niger's claimancy. It was a move greatly criticized by the contemporary consul and historian Cassius Dio who said that Severus had destroyed "a strong Roman outpost and a base of operations against the barbarians from Pontus and Asia". He would later rebuild Byzantium towards the end of his reign, in which it would be briefly renamed Augusta Antonina, fortifying it with a new city wall in his name, the Severan Wall.

324–337: The refoundation as Constantinople 

Constantine had altogether more colourful plans. Having restored the unity of the Empire, and, being in the course of major governmental reforms as well as of sponsoring the consolidation of the Christian church, he was well aware that Rome was an unsatisfactory capital. Rome was too far from the frontiers, and hence from the armies and the imperial courts, and it offered an undesirable playground for disaffected politicians. Yet it had been the capital of the state for over a thousand years, and it might have seemed unthinkable to suggest that the capital be moved to a different location. Nevertheless, Constantine identified the site of Byzantium as the right place: a place where an emperor could sit, readily defended, with easy access to the Danube or the Euphrates frontiers, his court supplied from the rich gardens and sophisticated workshops of Roman Asia, his treasuries filled by the wealthiest provinces of the Empire.

Constantinople was built over six years, and consecrated on 11 May 330. Constantine divided the expanded city, like Rome, into 14 regions, and ornamented it with public works worthy of an imperial metropolis. Yet, at first, Constantine's new Rome did not have all the dignities of old Rome. It possessed a proconsul, rather than an urban prefect. It had no praetors, tribunes, or quaestors. Although it did have senators, they held the title clarus, not clarissimus, like those of Rome. It also lacked the panoply of other administrative offices regulating the food supply, police, statues, temples, sewers, aqueducts, or other public works. The new programme of building was carried out in great haste: columns, marbles, doors, and tiles were taken wholesale from the temples of the empire and moved to the new city. In similar fashion, many of the greatest works of Greek and Roman art were soon to be seen in its squares and streets. The emperor stimulated private building by promising householders gifts of land from the imperial estates in Asiana and Pontica and on 18 May 332 he announced that, as in Rome, free distributions of food would be made to the citizens. At the time, the amount is said to have been 80,000 rations a day, doled out from 117 distribution points around the city.

Constantine laid out a new square at the centre of old Byzantium, naming it the Augustaeum. The new senate-house (or Curia) was housed in a basilica on the east side. On the south side of the great square was erected the Great Palace of the Emperor with its imposing entrance, the Chalke, and its ceremonial suite known as the Palace of Daphne. Nearby was the vast Hippodrome for chariot-races, seating over 80,000 spectators, and the famed Baths of Zeuxippus. At the western entrance to the Augustaeum was the Milion, a vaulted monument from which distances were measured across the Eastern Roman Empire.

From the Augustaeum led a great street, the Mese, lined with colonnades. As it descended the First Hill of the city and climbed the Second Hill, it passed on the left the Praetorium or law-court. Then it passed through the oval Forum of Constantine where there was a second Senate-house and a high column with a statue of Constantine himself in the guise of Helios, crowned with a halo of seven rays and looking toward the rising sun. From there, the Mese passed on and through the Forum Tauri and then the Forum Bovis, and finally up the Seventh Hill (or Xerolophus) and through to the Golden Gate in the Constantinian Wall. After the construction of the Theodosian Walls in the early 5th century, it was extended to the new Golden Gate, reaching a total length of seven Roman miles. After the construction of the Theodosian Walls, Constantinople consisted of an area approximately the size of Old Rome within the Aurelian walls, or some 1,400 ha.

337–529: Constantinople during the Barbarian Invasions and the fall of the West 

The importance of Constantinople increased, but it was gradual. From the death of Constantine in 337 to the accession of Theodosius I, emperors had been resident only in the years 337–338, 347–351, 358–361, 368–369. Its status as a capital was recognized by the appointment of the first known Urban Prefect of the City Honoratus, who held office from 11 December 359 until 361. The urban prefects had concurrent jurisdiction over three provinces each in the adjacent dioceses of Thrace (in which the city was located), Pontus and Asia comparable to the 100-mile extraordinary jurisdiction of the prefect of Rome. The emperor Valens, who hated the city and spent only one year there, nevertheless built the Palace of Hebdomon on the shore of the Propontis near the Golden Gate, probably for use when reviewing troops. All the emperors up to Zeno and Basiliscus were crowned and acclaimed at the Hebdomon. Theodosius I founded the Church of John the Baptist to house the skull of the saint (today preserved at the Topkapı Palace), put up a memorial pillar to himself in the Forum of Taurus, and turned the ruined temple of Aphrodite into a coach house for the Praetorian Prefect; Arcadius built a new forum named after himself on the Mese, near the walls of Constantine.

After the shock of the Battle of Adrianople in 378, in which the emperor Valens with the flower of the Roman armies was destroyed by the Visigoths within a few days' march, the city looked to its defences, and in 413–414 Theodosius II built the 18-metre (60-foot)-tall triple-wall fortifications, which were not to be breached until the coming of gunpowder. Theodosius also founded a University near the Forum of Taurus, on 27 February 425.

Uldin, a prince of the Huns, appeared on the Danube about this time and advanced into Thrace, but he was deserted by many of his followers, who joined with the Romans in driving their king back north of the river. Subsequent to this, new walls were built to defend the city and the fleet on the Danube improved.

After the barbarians overran the Western Roman Empire, Constantinople became the indisputable capital city of the Roman Empire. Emperors were no longer peripatetic between various court capitals and palaces. They remained in their palace in the Great City and sent generals to command their armies. The wealth of the eastern Mediterranean and western Asia flowed into Constantinople.

527–565: Constantinople in the Age of Justinian 

The emperor Justinian I (527–565) was known for his successes in war, for his legal reforms and for his public works. It was from Constantinople that his expedition for the reconquest of the former Diocese of Africa set sail on or about 21 June 533. Before their departure, the ship of the commander Belisarius was anchored in front of the Imperial palace, and the Patriarch offered prayers for the success of the enterprise. After the victory, in 534, the Temple treasure of Jerusalem, looted by the Romans in AD 70 and taken to Carthage by the Vandals after their sack of Rome in 455, was brought to Constantinople and deposited for a time, perhaps in the Church of St Polyeuctus, before being returned to Jerusalem in either the Church of the Resurrection or the New Church.

Chariot-racing had been important in Rome for centuries. In Constantinople, the hippodrome became over time increasingly a place of political significance. It was where (as a shadow of the popular elections of old Rome) the people by acclamation showed their approval of a new emperor, and also where they openly criticized the government, or clamoured for the removal of unpopular ministers. In the time of Justinian, public order in Constantinople became a critical political issue.

Throughout the late Roman and early Byzantine periods, Christianity was resolving fundamental questions of identity, and the dispute between the orthodox and the monophysites became the cause of serious disorder, expressed through allegiance to the chariot-racing parties of the Blues and the Greens. The partisans of the Blues and the Greens were said to affect untrimmed facial hair, head hair shaved at the front and grown long at the back, and wide-sleeved tunics tight at the wrist; and to form gangs to engage in night-time muggings and street violence. At last these disorders took the form of a major rebellion of 532, known as the "Nika" riots (from the battle-cry of "Conquer!" of those involved).

Fires started by the Nika rioters consumed the Theodosian basilica of Hagia Sophia (Holy Wisdom), the city's cathedral, which lay to the north of the Augustaeum and had itself replaced the Constantinian basilica founded by Constantius II to replace the first Byzantine cathedral, Hagia Irene (Holy Peace). Justinian commissioned Anthemius of Tralles and Isidore of Miletus to replace it with a new and incomparable Hagia Sophia. This was the great cathedral of the city, whose dome was said to be held aloft by God alone, and which was directly connected to the palace so that the imperial family could attend services without passing through the streets. The dedication took place on 26 December 537 in the presence of the emperor, who was later reported to have exclaimed, "O Solomon, I have outdone thee!" Hagia Sophia was served by 600 people including 80 priests, and cost 20,000 pounds of gold to build.

Justinian also had Anthemius and Isidore demolish and replace the original Church of the Holy Apostles and Hagia Irene built by Constantine with new churches under the same dedication. The Justinianic Church of the Holy Apostles was designed in the form of an equal-armed cross with five domes, and ornamented with beautiful mosaics. This church was to remain the burial place of the emperors from Constantine himself until the 11th century. When the city fell to the Turks in 1453, the church was demolished to make room for the tomb of Mehmet II the Conqueror. Justinian was also concerned with other aspects of the city's built environment, legislating against the abuse of laws prohibiting building within  of the sea front, in order to protect the view.

During Justinian I's reign, the city's population reached about 500,000 people. However, the social fabric of Constantinople was also damaged by the onset of the Plague of Justinian between 541 and 542 AD. It killed perhaps 40% of the city's inhabitants.

Survival, 565–717: Constantinople during the Byzantine Dark Ages 
In the early 7th century, the Avars and later the Bulgars overwhelmed much of the Balkans, threatening Constantinople with attack from the west. Simultaneously, the Persian Sassanids overwhelmed the Prefecture of the East and penetrated deep into Anatolia. Heraclius, son of the exarch of Africa, set sail for the city and assumed the throne. He found the military situation so dire that he is said to have contemplated withdrawing the imperial capital to Carthage, but relented after the people of Constantinople begged him to stay. The citizens lost their right to free grain in 618 when Heraclius realized that the city could no longer be supplied from Egypt as a result of the Persian wars: the population fell substantially as a result.

While the city withstood a siege by the Sassanids and Avars in 626, Heraclius campaigned deep into Persian territory and briefly restored the status quo in 628, when the Persians surrendered all their conquests. However, further sieges followed the Arab conquests, first from 674 to 678 and then in 717 to 718. The Theodosian Walls kept the city impenetrable from the land, while a newly discovered incendiary substance known as Greek Fire allowed the Byzantine navy to destroy the Arab fleets and keep the city supplied. In the second siege, the second ruler of Bulgaria, Khan Tervel, rendered decisive help. He was called Saviour of Europe.

717–1025: Constantinople during the Macedonian Renaissance 

In the 730s Leo III carried out extensive repairs of the Theodosian walls, which had been damaged by frequent and violent attacks; this work was financed by a special tax on all the subjects of the Empire.

Theodora, widow of the Emperor Theophilus (died 842), acted as regent during the minority of her son Michael III, who was said to have been introduced to dissolute habits by her brother Bardas. When Michael assumed power in 856, he became known for excessive drunkenness, appeared in the hippodrome as a charioteer and burlesqued the religious processions of the clergy. He removed Theodora from the Great Palace to the Carian Palace and later to the monastery of Gastria, but, after the death of Bardas, she was released to live in the palace of St Mamas; she also had a rural residence at the Anthemian Palace, where Michael was assassinated in 867.

In 860, an attack was made on the city by a new principality set up a few years earlier at Kiev by Askold and Dir, two Varangian chiefs: Two hundred small vessels passed through the Bosporus and plundered the monasteries and other properties on the suburban Princes' Islands. Oryphas, the admiral of the Byzantine fleet, alerted the emperor Michael, who promptly put the invaders to flight; but the suddenness and savagery of the onslaught made a deep impression on the citizens.

In 980, the emperor Basil II received an unusual gift from Prince Vladimir of Kiev: 6,000 Varangian warriors, which Basil formed into a new bodyguard known as the Varangian Guard. They were known for their ferocity, honour, and loyalty. It is said that, in 1038, they were dispersed in winter quarters in the Thracesian Theme when one of their number attempted to violate a countrywoman, but in the struggle she seized his sword and killed him; instead of taking revenge, however, his comrades applauded her conduct, compensated her with all his possessions, and exposed his body without burial as if he had committed suicide. However, following the death of an Emperor, they became known also for plunder in the Imperial palaces. Later in the 11th century the Varangian Guard became dominated by Anglo-Saxons who preferred this way of life to subjugation by the new Norman kings of England.

The Book of the Eparch, which dates to the 10th century, gives a detailed picture of the city's commercial life and its organization at that time. The corporations in which the tradesmen of Constantinople were organised were supervised by the Eparch, who regulated such matters as production, prices, import, and export. Each guild had its own monopoly, and tradesmen might not belong to more than one. It is an impressive testament to the strength of tradition how little these arrangements had changed since the office, then known by the Latin version of its title, had been set up in 330 to mirror the urban prefecture of Rome.

In the 9th and 10th centuries, Constantinople had a population of between 500,000 and 800,000.

Iconoclast controversy in Constantinople 
In the 8th and 9th centuries, the iconoclast movement caused serious political unrest throughout the Empire. The emperor Leo III issued a decree in 726 against images, and ordered the destruction of a statue of Christ over one of the doors of the Chalke, an act that was fiercely resisted by the citizens. Constantine V convoked a church council in 754, which condemned the worship of images, after which many treasures were broken, burned, or painted over with depictions of trees, birds or animals: One source refers to the church of the Holy Virgin at Blachernae as having been transformed into a "fruit store and aviary". Following the death of her husband Leo IV in 780, the empress Irene restored the veneration of images through the agency of the Second Council of Nicaea in 787.

The iconoclast controversy returned in the early 9th century, only to be resolved once more in 843 during the regency of Empress Theodora, who restored the icons. These controversies contributed to the deterioration of relations between the Western and the Eastern Churches.

1025–1081: Constantinople after Basil II 

In the late 11th century catastrophe struck with the unexpected and calamitous defeat of the imperial armies at the Battle of Manzikert in Armenia in 1071. The Emperor Romanus Diogenes was captured. The peace terms demanded by Alp Arslan, sultan of the Seljuk Turks, were not excessive, and Romanus accepted them. On his release, however, Romanus found that enemies had placed their own candidate on the throne in his absence; he surrendered to them and suffered death by torture, and the new ruler, Michael VII Ducas, refused to honour the treaty. In response, the Turks began to move into Anatolia in 1073. The collapse of the old defensive system meant that they met no opposition, and the empire's resources were distracted and squandered in a series of civil wars. Thousands of Turkoman tribesmen crossed the unguarded frontier and moved into Anatolia. By 1080, a huge area had been lost to the Empire, and the Turks were within striking distance of Constantinople.

1081–1185: Constantinople under the Comneni 

Under the Comnenian dynasty (1081–1185), Byzantium staged a remarkable recovery. In 1090–91, the nomadic Pechenegs reached the walls of Constantinople, where Emperor Alexius I with the aid of the Kipchaks annihilated their army. In response to a call for aid from Alexius, the First Crusade assembled at Constantinople in 1096, but declining to put itself under Byzantine command set out for Jerusalem on its own account. John II built the monastery of the Pantocrator (Almighty) with a hospital for the poor of 50 beds.

With the restoration of firm central government, the empire became fabulously wealthy. The population was rising (estimates for Constantinople in the 12th century vary from some 100,000 to 500,000), and towns and cities across the realm flourished. Meanwhile, the volume of money in circulation dramatically increased. This was reflected in Constantinople by the construction of the Blachernae palace, the creation of brilliant new works of art, and general prosperity at this time: an increase in trade, made possible by the growth of the Italian city-states, may have helped the growth of the economy. It is certain that the Venetians and others were active traders in Constantinople, making a living out of shipping goods between the Crusader Kingdoms of Outremer and the West, while also trading extensively with Byzantium and Egypt. The Venetians had factories on the north side of the Golden Horn, and large numbers of westerners were present in the city throughout the 12th century. Toward the end of Manuel I Komnenos's reign, the number of foreigners in the city reached about 60,000–80,000 people out of a total population of about 400,000 people. In 1171, Constantinople also contained a small community of 2,500 Jews. In 1182, most Latin (Western European) inhabitants of Constantinople were massacred.

In artistic terms, the 12th century was a very productive period. There was a revival in the mosaic art, for example: Mosaics became more realistic and vivid, with an increased emphasis on depicting three-dimensional forms. There was an increased demand for art, with more people having access to the necessary wealth to commission and pay for such work. According to N.H. Baynes (Byzantium, An Introduction to East Roman Civilization):

1185–1261: Constantinople during the Imperial Exile 

On 25 July 1197, Constantinople was struck by a severe fire which burned the Latin Quarter and the area around the Gate of the Droungarios on the Golden Horn. Nevertheless, the destruction wrought by the 1197 fire paled in comparison with that brought by the Crusaders. In the course of a plot between Philip of Swabia, Boniface of Montferrat and the Doge of Venice, the Fourth Crusade was, despite papal excommunication, diverted in 1203 against Constantinople, ostensibly promoting the claims of Alexios IV Angelos brother-in-law of Philip, son of the deposed emperor Isaac II Angelos. The reigning emperor Alexios III Angelos had made no preparation. The Crusaders occupied Galata, broke the defensive chain protecting the Golden Horn, and entered the harbour, where on 27 July they breached the sea walls: Alexios III fled. But the new Alexios IV Angelos found the Treasury inadequate, and was unable to make good the rewards he had promised to his western allies. Tension between the citizens and the Latin soldiers increased. In January 1204, the protovestiarius Alexios Murzuphlos provoked a riot, it is presumed, to intimidate Alexios IV, but whose only result was the destruction of the great statue of Athena Promachos, the work of Phidias, which stood in the principal forum facing west.

In February 1204, the people rose again: Alexios IV was imprisoned and executed, and Murzuphlos took the purple as Alexios V Doukas. He made some attempt to repair the walls and organise the citizenry, but there had been no opportunity to bring in troops from the provinces and the guards were demoralised by the revolution. An attack by the Crusaders on 6 April failed, but a second from the Golden Horn on 12 April succeeded, and the invaders poured in. Alexios V fled. The Senate met in Hagia Sophia and offered the crown to Theodore Lascaris, who had married into the Angelos dynasty, but it was too late. He came out with the Patriarch to the Golden Milestone before the Great Palace and addressed the Varangian Guard. Then the two of them slipped away with many of the nobility and embarked for Asia. By the next day the Doge and the leading Franks were installed in the Great Palace, and the city was given over to pillage for three days.

Sir Steven Runciman, historian of the Crusades, wrote that the sack of Constantinople is "unparalleled in history".

For the next half-century, Constantinople was the seat of the Latin Empire. Under the rulers of the Latin Empire, the city declined, both in population and the condition of its buildings. Alice-Mary Talbot cites an estimated population for Constantinople of 400,000 inhabitants; after the destruction wrought by the Crusaders on the city, about one third were homeless, and numerous courtiers, nobility, and higher clergy, followed various leading personages into exile. "As a result Constantinople became seriously depopulated," Talbot concludes.

The Latins took over at least 20 churches and 13 monasteries, most prominently the Hagia Sophia, which became the cathedral of the Latin Patriarch of Constantinople. It is to these that E.H. Swift attributed the construction of a series of flying buttresses to shore up the walls of the church, which had been weakened over the centuries by earthquake tremors. However, this act of maintenance is an exception: for the most part, the Latin occupiers were too few to maintain all of the buildings, either secular and sacred, and many became targets for vandalism or dismantling. Bronze and lead were removed from the roofs of abandoned buildings and melted down and sold to provide money to the chronically under-funded Empire for defense and to support the court; Deno John Geanokoplos writes that "it may well be that a division is suggested here: Latin laymen stripped secular buildings, ecclesiastics, the churches." Buildings were not the only targets of officials looking to raise funds for the impoverished Latin Empire: the monumental sculptures which adorned the Hippodrome and fora of the city were pulled down and melted for coinage. "Among the masterpieces destroyed, writes Talbot, "were a Herakles attributed to the fourth-century B.C. sculptor Lysippos, and monumental figures of Hera, Paris, and Helen."

The Nicaean emperor John III Vatatzes reportedly saved several churches from being dismantled for their valuable building materials; by sending money to the Latins "to buy them off" (exonesamenos), he prevented the destruction of several churches. According to Talbot, these included the churches of Blachernae, Rouphinianai, and St. Michael at Anaplous. He also granted funds for the restoration of the Church of the Holy Apostles, which had been seriously damaged in an earthquake.

The Byzantine nobility scattered, many going to Nicaea, where Theodore Lascaris set up an imperial court, or to Epirus, where Theodore Angelus did the same; others fled to Trebizond, where one of the Comneni had already with Georgian support established an independent seat of empire. Nicaea and Epirus both vied for the imperial title, and tried to recover Constantinople. In 1261, Constantinople was captured from its last Latin ruler, Baldwin II, by the forces of the Nicaean emperor Michael VIII Palaiologos under the command of Caesar Alexios Strategopoulos.

1261–1453: Palaiologan Era and the Fall of Constantinople 

Although Constantinople was retaken by Michael VIII Palaiologos, the Empire had lost many of its key economic resources, and struggled to survive. The palace of Blachernae in the north-west of the city became the main Imperial residence, with the old Great Palace on the shores of the Bosporus going into decline. When Michael VIII captured the city, its population was 35,000 people, but, by the end of his reign, he had succeeded in increasing the population to about 70,000 people. The Emperor achieved this by summoning former residents who had fled the city when the crusaders captured it, and by relocating Greeks from the recently reconquered Peloponnese to the capital. Military defeats, civil wars, earthquakes and natural disasters were joined by the Black Death, which in 1347 spread to Constantinople, exacerbated the people's sense that they were doomed by God. In 1453, when the Ottoman Turks captured the city, it contained approximately 50,000 people.

Constantinople was conquered by the Ottoman Empire on 29 May 1453. Mehmed II intended to complete his father’s mission and conquer Constantinople for the Ottomans. In 1452 he reached peace treaties with Hungary and Venice. He also began the construction of the Boğazkesen (later called the Rumelihisarı), a fortress at the narrowest point of the Bosporus, in order to restrict passage between the Black and Mediterranean seas. Mehmed then tasked the Hungarian gunsmith Urban with both arming Rumelihisarı and building cannon powerful enough to bring down the walls of Constantinople. By March 1453 Urban’s cannon had been transported from the Ottoman capital of Edirne to the outskirts of Constantinople. In April, having quickly seized Byzantine coastal settlements along the Black Sea and Sea of Marmara, Ottoman regiments in Rumelia and Anatolia assembled outside the Byzantine capital. Their fleet moved from Gallipoli to nearby Diplokionion, and the sultan himself set out to meet his army.
The Ottomans were commanded by 21-year-old Ottoman Sultan Mehmed II. The conquest of Constantinople followed a seven-week siege which had begun on 6 April 1453.

1453–1922: Ottoman Kostantiniyye 

The Christian Orthodox city of Constantinople was now under Ottoman control. When Mehmed II finally entered Constantinople through the Gate of Charisius (today known as Edirnekapı or Adrianople Gate), he immediately rode his horse to the Hagia Sophia, where after the doors were axed down, the thousands of citizens hiding within the sanctuary were raped and enslaved, often with slavers fighting each other to the death over particularly beautiful and valuable slave girls. Moreover, symbols of Christianity were everywhere vandalized or destroyed, including the crucifix of Hagia Sophia which was paraded through the sultan's camps. Afterwards he ordered his soldiers to stop hacking at the city's valuable marbles and 'be satisfied with the booty and captives; as for all the buildings, they belonged to him'. He ordered that an imam meet him there in order to chant the adhan thus transforming the Orthodox cathedral into a Muslim mosque, solidifying Islamic rule in Constantinople.

Mehmed's main concern with Constantinople had to do with solidifying control over the city and rebuilding its defenses. After 45,000 captives were marched from the city, building projects were commenced immediately after the conquest, which included the repair of the walls, construction of the citadel, and building a new palace. Mehmed issued orders across his empire that Muslims, Christians, and Jews should resettle the city, with Christians and Jews required to pay jizya and Muslims pay Zakat; he demanded that five thousand households needed to be transferred to Constantinople by September. From all over the Islamic empire, prisoners of war and deported people were sent to the city: these people were called "Sürgün" in Turkish. Two centuries later, Ottoman traveler Evliya Çelebi gave a list of groups introduced into the city with their respective origins. Even today, many quarters of Istanbul, such as Aksaray, Çarşamba, bear the names of the places of origin of their inhabitants. However, many people escaped again from the city, and there were several outbreaks of plague, so that in 1459 Mehmed allowed the deported Greeks to come back to the city.

Culture 

Constantinople was the largest and richest urban center in the Eastern Mediterranean Sea during the late Eastern Roman Empire, mostly as a result of its strategic position commanding the trade routes between the Aegean Sea and the Black Sea. It would remain the capital of the eastern, Greek-speaking empire for over a thousand years. At its peak, roughly corresponding to the Middle Ages, it was one of the richest and largest cities in Europe. It exerted a powerful cultural pull and dominated much of the economic life in the Mediterranean. Visitors and merchants were especially struck by the beautiful monasteries and churches of the city, in particular the Hagia Sophia, or the Church of Holy Wisdom. According to Russian 14th-century traveler Stephen of Novgorod: "As for Hagia Sophia, the human mind can neither tell it nor make description of it."

It was especially important for preserving in its libraries manuscripts of Greek and Latin authors throughout a period when instability and disorder caused their mass-destruction in western Europe and north Africa: On the city's fall, thousands of these were brought by refugees to Italy, and played a key part in stimulating the Renaissance, and the transition to the modern world. The cumulative influence of the city on the west, over the many centuries of its existence, is incalculable. In terms of technology, art and culture, as well as sheer size, Constantinople was without parallel anywhere in Europe for a thousand years. Many languages were spoken in Constantinople. A 16th century Chinese geographical treatise specifically recorded that there were translators living in the city, indicating this was a multilingual, multicultural cosmopolitan.

Women in literature

Constantinople was home to the first known Western Armenian journal published and edited by a woman (Elpis Kesaratsian). Entering circulation in 1862, Kit'arr or Guitar stayed in print for only seven months. Female writers who openly expressed their desires were viewed as immodest, but this changed slowly as journals began to publish more "women's sections". In the 1880s, Matteos Mamurian invited Srpouhi Dussap to submit essays for Arevelian Mamal. According to Zaruhi Galemkearian's autobiography, she was told to write about women's place in the family and home after she published two volumes of poetry in the 1890s. By 1900, several Armenian journals had started to include works by female contributors including the Constantinople-based Tsaghik.

Markets

Even before Constantinople was founded, the markets of Byzantion were mentioned first by Xenophon and then by Theopompus who wrote that Byzantians "spent their time at the market and the harbour". In Justinian's age the Mese street running across the city from east to west was a daily market. Procopius claimed "more than 500 prostitutes" did business along the market street. Ibn Batutta who traveled to the city in 1325 wrote of the bazaars "Astanbul" in which the "majority of the artisans and salespeople in them are women".

Architecture 

The Byzantine Empire used Roman and Greek architectural models and styles to create its own unique type of architecture. The influence of Byzantine architecture and art can be seen in the copies taken from it throughout Europe. Particular examples include St Mark's Basilica in Venice, the basilicas of Ravenna, and many churches throughout the Slavic East. Also, alone in Europe until the 13th-century Italian florin, the Empire continued to produce sound gold coinage, the solidus of Diocletian becoming the bezant prized throughout the Middle Ages. Its city walls were much imitated (for example, see Caernarfon Castle) and its urban infrastructure was moreover a marvel throughout the Middle Ages, keeping alive the art, skill and technical expertise of the Roman Empire. In the Ottoman period Islamic architecture and symbolism were used. 
Great bathhouses were built in Byzantine centers such as Constantinople and Antioch.

Religion 
Constantine's foundation gave prestige to the Bishop of Constantinople, who eventually came to be known as the Ecumenical Patriarch, and made it a prime center of Christianity alongside Rome. This contributed to cultural and theological differences between Eastern and Western Christianity eventually leading to the Great Schism that divided Western Catholicism from Eastern Orthodoxy from 1054 onwards. Constantinople is also of great religious importance to Islam, as the conquest of Constantinople is one of the signs of the End time in Islam.

Education 
In 1909, in Constantinople there were 626 primary schools and 12 secondary schools. Of the primary schools, 561 were of the lower grade and 65 were of the higher grade; of the latter, 34 were public and 31 were private. There was one secondary college and eleven secondary preparatory schools.

Media 

In the past the Bulgarian newspapers in the late Ottoman period were Makedoniya, Napredŭk, and Pravo.

International status 

The city provided a defence for the eastern provinces of the old Roman Empire against the barbarian invasions of the 5th century. The 18-meter-tall walls built by Theodosius II were, in essence, impregnable to the barbarians coming from south of the Danube river, who found easier targets to the west rather than the richer provinces to the east in Asia. From the 5th century, the city was also protected by the Anastasian Wall, a 60-kilometer chain of walls across the Thracian peninsula. Many scholars argue that these sophisticated fortifications allowed the east to develop relatively unmolested while Ancient Rome and the west collapsed.

Constantinople's fame was such that it was described even in contemporary Chinese histories, the Old and New Book of Tang, which mentioned its massive walls and gates as well as a purported clepsydra mounted with a golden statue of a man. The Chinese histories even related how the city had been besieged in the 7th century by Muawiyah I and how he exacted tribute in a peace settlement.

See also

People from Constantinople 
 List of people from Constantinople

Secular buildings and monuments 

 Augustaion
 Column of Justinian
 Basilica Cistern
 Column of Marcian
 Bucoleon Palace
 Horses of Saint Mark
 Obelisk of Theodosius
 Serpent Column
 Walled Obelisk
 Palace of Lausus
 Cistern of Philoxenos
 Palace of the Porphyrogenitus
 Prison of Anemas
 Valens Aqueduct

Churches, monasteries and mosques 

 Atik Mustafa Pasha Mosque
 Bodrum Mosque
 Chora Church
 Church of Saints Sergius and Bacchus
 Church of the Holy Apostles
 Church of St. Polyeuctus
 Eski Imaret Mosque
 Fenari Isa Mosque
 Gül Mosque
 Hagia Irene
 Hirami Ahmet Pasha Mosque
 Kalenderhane Mosque
 Koca Mustafa Pasha Mosque
 Nea Ekklesia
 Pammakaristos Church
 Stoudios Monastery
 Toklu Dede Mosque
 Vefa Kilise Mosque
 Zeyrek Mosque
 Unnamed Mosque established during Byzantine times for visiting Muslim dignitaries

Miscellaneous 

 Ahmed Bican Yazıcıoğlu
 Byzantine calendar
 Byzantine silk
 Eparch of Constantinople (List of eparchs)
 Sieges of Constantinople
 Third Rome
 Thracia
 Timeline of Istanbul history

Notes

References

Bibliography 

 Ball, Warwick (2016). Rome in the East: Transformation of an Empire, 2nd edition. London & New York: Routledge. .
 
 
 
 Emerson, Charles. 1913: In Search of the World Before the Great War (2013) compares Constantinople to 20 major world cities; pp 358–80.
 
 
 
 
 
 
  online review 
 
 
 
 Ibrahim, Raymond (2018). Sword and Scimitar, 1st edition. New York. .
 
 Klein, Konstantin M.: Wienand, Johannes (2022) (eds.): City of Caesar, City of God: Constantinople and Jerusalem in Late Antiquity. De Gruyter, Berlin 2022, ISBN 978-3-11-071720-4. doi: https://doi.org/10.1515/9783110718447.
 Korolija Fontana-Giusti, Gordana 'The Urban Language of Early Constantinople: The Changing Roles of the Arts and Architecture in the Formation of the New Capital and the New Consciousness' in Intercultural Transmission in the Medieval Mediterranean, (2012), Stephanie L. Hathaway and David W. Kim (eds), London: Continuum, pp 164–202. .
 
 
 
 
 
 
 
 Yule, Henry (1915). Henri Cordier (ed.), Cathay and the Way Thither: Being a Collection of Medieval Notices of China, Vol I: Preliminary Essay on the Intercourse Between China and the Western Nations Previous to the Discovery of the Cape Route. London: Hakluyt Society. Accessed 21 September 2016.

External links 

 Constantinople, from History of the Later Roman Empire, by J. B. Bury
 History of Constantinople from the "New Advent Catholic Encyclopedia".
 Monuments of Byzantium – Pantokrator Monastery of Constantinople
 Constantinoupolis on the web Select internet resources on the history and culture
 Info on the name change from the Foundation for the Advancement of Sephardic Studies and Culture
 , documenting the monuments of Byzantine Constantinople
 Byzantium 1200, a project aimed at creating computer reconstructions of the Byzantine monuments located in Istanbul in 1200 AD.
 Constantine and Constantinople How and why Constantinople was founded
 Hagia Sophia Mosaics The Deesis and other Mosaics of Hagia Sophia in Constantinople

 
320s establishments in the Roman Empire
330 establishments
1453 disestablishments in the Ottoman Empire
15th-century disestablishments in the Byzantine Empire
Capitals of former nations
Constantine the Great

Holy cities
Populated places along the Silk Road
Populated places established in the 4th century
Populated places disestablished in the 15th century
Populated places of the Byzantine Empire
Roman towns and cities in Turkey
Thrace